Timothy D. Perry (born June 4, 1965) is an American former basketball player. Following his college career with Temple he played professionally for 13 seasons in the National Basketball Association and Liga ACB.

Playing career
Perry played college basketball for Temple University from 1984 to 1988 and left as the schools leader in blocks with 392. He was selected seventh overall by the Phoenix Suns in the 1988 NBA draft. Through eight NBA seasons, he averaged 6.8 points and 4 rebounds per game. Charles Barkley claims in Sir Charles: The Wit and Wisdom of Charles Barkley that the Suns had to trade Perry to Philadelphia in 1992 because he was #34, Barkley's number. Perry appeared in three NBA Slam Dunk Contests, finishing 5th in 1989, 7th in 1993, and 5th in 1995.

For the 1996–1997 season, he moved over to Spain where he spent the next five seasons in the Liga ACB. In 1998, he won the Copa del Rey de Baloncesto with Pamesa Valencia.

Later life
Perry later became an assistant coach for Holy Family University, Pennsylvania of the Central Atlantic Collegiate Conference in NCAA Division II. In 2011, he received a degree in liberal studies from Neumann University.

On the October 25, 2017 broadcast of NBA Gametime on the NBA Channel, Shaquille O'Neal claimed that he had been "dunked on" only three times in his 20-year NBA career.  Shaq said he had been dunked on by Michael Jordan, Derrick Coleman, and Tim Perry.

See also
List of NCAA Division I men's basketball career blocks leaders

References

External links
 Tim Perry's 1992-93 Fleer Ultra Basketball Card

1965 births
Living people
African-American basketball players
American expatriate basketball people in Spain
American men's basketball players
Basketball players from New Jersey
Bàsquet Manresa players
Club Ourense Baloncesto players
Freehold High School alumni
Holy Family University
Liga ACB players
New Jersey Nets players
People from Freehold Borough, New Jersey
Philadelphia 76ers players
Phoenix Suns draft picks
Phoenix Suns players
Power forwards (basketball)
Sportspeople from Monmouth County, New Jersey
Temple Owls men's basketball players
Valencia Basket players
21st-century African-American people
20th-century African-American sportspeople